The transport/transportation and logistics industry is a category of companies that provide services to transport people or goods. The Global Industry Classification Standard (GICS) lists transport below the industrials sector. The sector consists of several industries including  logistics and air freight or airlines, marine, road and rail, and their respective infrastructures. Entire stock market indexes focus on the sector, like the Dow Jones Transportation Index (DJTA).

In the EU, the transport industry directly employs around 10 million people and accounts for about 5% of the gross domestic product (GDP). Logistics account for 10–15% of the cost of a finished product for European companies. On average 13.2% of every household's budget is spent on transport, which still depends heavily on fossil fuels and represents an important source of  emissions. Emissions from road freight transport have risen by more than 20% since 1995, counterweighting the increased energy efficiency of vehicles.

Logistics and transport as the basis of global trade is worth over 5.7 trillion Euros.

Global players
According to Forbes Global 2000,  FedEx is the biggest transportation and logistics company in the world in 2021, closely followed by UPS.

See also
Shipping industry
Rail industry
Logistics industry
Freight industry

References

External links

Logistics industry